Erhaoqiao Subdistrict is a subdistrict on southeastern Hedong District, Tianjin. It borders Wanxin and Xinli Subdistricts to the northerst, Zhangguizhuang Subdistrict to the southeast, Wanxin Subdistrict to the southwest, as well as Fumin Road and Zhongshanmen Subdistricts to the northwest. The population of Erhaoqiao Subdistrict was 61,547 in 2010.

The subdistrict was created in 1977 from part of Zhongshanmen Subdistrict. The name Erhaoqiao Literally means "Number 2 Bridge".

History

Administrative divisions 
As of the year 2021, Erhaoqiao Subdistrict covered 16 communities. They are organized in the list below:

References 

Township-level divisions of Tianjin
Hedong District, Tianjin